AIK Banka (full legal name: AIK Banka a.d. Belgrade) is a commercial bank based in Belgrade, Serbia.

History

1976–2014
Upon being founded, AIK Banka initially operated as an internal bank of the Agro Industrial Combine Niš since 1976. On 10 August 1993, after obtaining the license of the National Bank of Yugoslavia, it became a full-fledged financial institution, working with legal entities and individual clients, registered as a joint venture.

Greek ATEbank acquired 24.99% of common and 24.99% of preferential shares of AIK Banka in 2006 for an undisclosed amount.

2014–present: Takeover by MK Group
In February 2014, a Serbian company Sunoko (subsidiary of MK Group), became the major shareholder of the company with 50.37% of total shares at the time. On 1 July 2015, the bank moved its headquarters from Niš to Belgrade, and also changed its legal name to AIK Banka a.d. Belgrade.

In 2015, AIK Banka became a member of the MK Group. By purchasing the shares of the Slovenian Gorenjska banka in 2016, AIK Banka increased its income and profitability, continuing its expansion outside the Serbian market, i.e. toward the EU.

Locally, AIK Banka ensured further growth by acquiring 100% of shares of Alpha Bank in April 2017. On 22 December 2017, Jubanka has completed the process of merging into AIK Banka and more than 800 of Jubanka's employees have left the company from June until December 2017.

As of December 2017, AIK Banka owns 75.99% of shares in Slovenian Gorenjska banka. As of December 2017, Gorenjska banka controls 4.7% of Slovenian banking market share. AIK Banka finished the 2017 calendar year with record 101.97 million euros of net profit, the most in the Serbian banking market. In November 2021, AIK Banka bought the majority of shares of Sberbank Srbija. The process of merging was completed in December 2022.

In March 2023, AIK Banka bought the majority of shares of another bank operating in Serbia, Eurobank Direktna, for a total of 280 million euros.

Prizes and awards
The European Business Council, a renowned independent corporation of economic, social and humanitarian collaboration, acknowledged AIK Banka as the best regional institution at the International Socrates Award Ceremony  in 2016. Simultaneously, the President of the Executive Board, Ms. Jelena Galić, was named the manager of the year. Additionally, two years in a row, in 2015 and 2016, AIK Banka was a recipient of a prestigious award of a renowned international magazine ‘International Banker’, for the best commercial bank in Serbia and for providing best customer services in Eastern Europe.

See also
 List of banks in Serbia

References

External links
 

1976 establishments in Yugoslavia
2006 mergers and acquisitions
Banks established in 1976
Banks of Serbia
Companies based in Belgrade
Serbian brands